Isostola divisa is a moth of the family Erebidae. It was described by Francis Walker in 1854. It is found in Brazil and French Guiana.

References

 

Arctiinae
Moths described in 1854